M1RA is a Hungarian auto racing team based in Kecskemét, Hungary. The team currently participates in the TCR Europe Series.

TCR International Series

Honda Civic Type R TCR FK2 (2017) 
The team was formed in March 2017 by World Touring Car Championship driver Norbert Michelisz and  race engineer Dávid Bári. The team fields two Honda Civic Type R TCR for veteran driver Roberto Colciago and Attila Tassi while Michelisz drove an additional Civic at Hungaroring.

Hyundai i30 N TCR (2018-) 
The team switched from Honda to Hyundai and Dániel Nagy, Francisco Mora joined the team, also the team switched from TCR International Series to TCR Europe Series.

Name 
M1 means that they wanted to create the best Hungarian racing team, the RA is the abbreviation of Racing. You pronounce it as Mira, which can mean Michelisz Racing. This word has more meaning: in Italian 'target', in Spanish 'view', in Russian 'peace'. Michelisz has a daughter called Mira.

Results

TCR International Series

TCR Europe Touring Car Series

References

External links 
 M1RA official website

Hungarian auto racing teams
TCR International Series teams
Auto racing teams established in 2017